The FA Cup 1956–57 is the 76th season of the world's oldest football knockout competition; The Football Association Challenge Cup, or FA Cup for short. The large number of clubs entering the tournament from lower down the English football league system meant that the competition started with a number of preliminary and qualifying rounds. The 30 victorious teams from the Fourth Round Qualifying progressed to the First Round Proper.

Preliminary round

Ties

Replays

2nd replays

1st qualifying round

Ties

Replays

2nd replay

2nd qualifying round

Ties

Replays

2nd replays

3rd qualifying round

Ties

Replays

2nd replay

4th qualifying round
The teams that given byes to this round are Crook Town, Walthamstow Avenue, Yeovil Town, Gainsborough Trinity, Weymouth, Rhyl, Hereford United, Wigan Athletic, Blyth Spartans, Peterborough United, Headington United, Hastings United, Guildford City, Nuneaton Borough, Selby Town, Newport I O W, Boston United, Scarborough, Netherfield, Dorchester Town, Worksop Town, Wycombe Wanderers, Burton Albion and Easington Colliery Welfare.

Ties

Replays

2nd replay

1956–57 FA Cup
See 1956-57 FA Cup for details of the rounds from the First Round Proper onwards.

External links
 Football Club History Database: FA Cup 1956–57
 FA Cup Past Results

Qualifying
FA Cup qualifying rounds